Kinito is a drinking game involving people, two dice, a table, a cup or basket, and beer or sangria or kalimotxo. Originally from Spain, this game evolves from Kiriki into a more social game. The object of the game is to force either the person preceding you or the person following you to drink.

Play
The players sit in a circle and the game proceeds clockwise. The first player throws the dice, with the cup or basket covering the dice so only he can see the score. He then tells the other players the score he wants them to think he has. The next person then decides whether they believe the first player or not. If they do, they are forced to call a higher score than the one they have accepted, upon rolling the dice. In other words, if the first player said 9, the subsequent player would be forced to say 9 or higher (calling a number equal to the prior player's guess is permissible), and so on. If a player does not believe the preceding player, the cup is lifted to show everyone the score. If the first player's score was what he claimed or higher, the person who lifted the cup drinks; if it was lower, the person who threw the dice drinks. After someone drinks, the score is reset.

Combinations that are not doubles can score 4 to 11 points. Doubles are always higher than other combinations, with the exception of the Kinito, which is the combination of a 1 and a 2. Sometimes, the combination of 5 and 6 is also considered a Kinito.

If a player rolls a Kinito, they reveal the dice themselves. A player who scores a Kinito can institute a rule (as in Twenty One, cancel an existing rule, or select another player by placing the basket on the head of the chosen player. That player then has three chances to roll a Kinito. If they fail, they drink. If they succeed, they select another player who repeats the process. This continues until someone fails to get a Kinito; that player then must drink the same number of drinks as there have been Kinitos.

See also

 List of drinking games

Drinking games